Valley Public Radio now branded as KVPR is a public radio organization in Fresno, California, broadcasting programming from National Public Radio (NPR) and other public radio producers and distributors, as well as locally produced news, music, talk, and public affairs programs. Valley Public Radio consists of two FM stations–KVPR in Fresno (89.3 MHz) and satellite station KPRX in Bakersfield (89.1 MHz).'''

Despite having no translators, the two stations' combined signal covers most of California's San Joaquin Valley, including the cities of Fresno, Bakersfield, Visalia, Madera, Tulare, Clovis, Merced, and Hanford; however, much of this area gets only grade B coverage.

The two stations operate at somewhat modest power for full NPR members on the FM band. KPRX operates with its maximum allowed U.S. Federal Communications Commission power (11,000 watts) for a Class B1 station with an antenna height of 152 meters; likewise KVPR broadcasts with its maximum allowed power (2,450 watts) and an antenna height of 576 meters for a Class B FM station.  In FM broadcasting effective radiated power is inversely proportional to antenna height.

History
In 1975, Richard Mays, Von Johnson and Randall (Jan) van Oosten formed White Ash Broadcasting in order to bring a public radio station to the Central Valley.

Initial operating funds for White Ash Broadcasting came from a 'seed' grant of $25,000 provided through a competitive grant award from the Corporation for Public Broadcasting (CPB).  In 1976, the U.S. Department of Health, Education and Welfare awarded White Ash Broadcasting a "matching grant" of $125,000 to cover the cost of studio and transmission equipment.  To earn the full grant award, the program required White Ash to raise $40,000 from local sources.

White Ash Broadcasting successfully petitioned the FCC for a construction permit in the fall of 1976, and received a full license two years later.  KVPR's first broadcast plant was located at 1515 Van Ness Avenue at the site of the former KMJ-AM/FM studios in the historic Fresno Bee Building. KVPR began regular broadcast services on October 15, 1978 and re-located to its current site on Shaw Avenue in the mid 1980s.  In May 2015, KVPR broke ground on a new studio in the Research & Technology Park in Clovis.  It is currently slated to move to the new studio in early 2016.

Valley Public Radio's initial programming mix was music, news and public affairs.  Nearly 75% of KVPR's original program schedule was locally produced, and included portions of jazz, folk and classical music in addition to select programming from National Public Radio.  Over time, KVPR would opt to focus on a combination of mostly NPR programming and classical music.

KPRX signed on in February 1987 as a full satellite of KVPR, replacing a low-power translator that had served the Bakersfield area since 1982. Bakersfield had previously been one of the largest cities in the country with no NPR stations.

On November 17, 2021, Valley Public Radio rebranded as KVPR to prevent branding confusion with Vermont Public Radio.

Repeater

References

External links
Valley Public Radio official website
Valley Public Radio on Diaryland
Valley Public Radio on Myspace

NPR member networks
Classical music radio stations in the United States

San Joaquin Valley
Radio stations established in 1976
1976 establishments in California